Hottah is a rock outcrop on the surface of Aeolis Palus, between Peace Vallis and Aeolis Mons ("Mount Sharp"), in Gale crater on the planet Mars.  The outcrop was encountered by the Curiosity rover on the way from Bradbury Landing to Glenelg Intrigue on September 14, 2012 (the 39th sol of the mission), and was named after Hottah Lake, the sixth largest lake in the Northwest Territories, Canada.  The "approximate" site coordinates are: .

The outcrop is a well-sorted gravel conglomerate, containing well-rounded, smooth, abraded pebbles. Occasional pebbles up to a few centimeters across are embedded in amongst a matrix of finer rounded particles, up to a centimeter across. It has been interpreted as a fluvial sediment, deposited by a vigorously flowing stream, probably between ankle and waist deep. This stream is part of an ancient alluvial fan, which descends from the steep terrain at the rim of Gale crater across its floor.

See also

Aeolis quadrangle 
Bedrock
Composition of Mars 
Geology of Mars 
Goulburn (Mars)
Link (Mars)
List of rocks on Mars
Rock outcrop
Timeline of Mars Science Laboratory
Water on Mars

References

External links 
Curiosity rover - Official Site
NASA - Mars Exploration Program 
Volcanic rock classification 
Video (04:32) - Evidence: Water "Vigorously" Flowed On Mars - September, 2012

Aeolis quadrangle
Mars Science Laboratory
Rocks on Mars